Rugrats is a Nickelodeon media franchise created by Klasky Csupo consisting of television shows, films, video games, and other entries. It commenced in 1991 with the premiere of the television series of the same name. The franchise revolves around the adventures of a group of toddler (tweenage to teenage in All Grown Up!) friends who learn about the world and their relationship to it. It is owned by Paramount Global.

Television shows

Rugrats (1991–2004)

All Grown Up! (2003–08)

Rugrats Pre-School Daze (2005)

Rugrats (2021–present)

Theatrical films

The Rugrats Movie (1998)

The story escalates when self-proclaimed leader, Tommy Pickles, is thrust into an impossible situation with the birth of his new brother, Dil. This new kid is grabbing all the attention and won't stop crying. With the help of the other toddlers, Lil and Phil, Tommy decides that the baby should be returned to the hospital for fixing. They all hop on their little wagon and take a high-speed ride straight into the deep woods where they realize they're lost. Chased around by a wolf and monkeys, the Rugrats clan must get home in one piece. This film guest stars David Spade as Ranger Frank, Whoopi Goldberg as Ranger Margret, and Tim Curry as Rex Pester. Meanwhile, Angelica Pickles, Tommy's cousin, sets out to find the babies and hurt them after they accidentally take her Cynthia doll with them.

Rugrats in Paris: The Movie (2000)

The film focuses on Chuckie Finster as he is on a search for a new mother. In this movie, Tommy's father, Stu, is invited to stay in Paris, France to rebuild a robotic Reptar used in a play. After convincing from Angelica, Stu's child-hating boss, Coco LaBouche, attempts to marry Chuckie's father, Chas, just to become the head of her company, Chuckie and the other Rugrats must stop her from becoming his mother. This film guest stars Susan Sarandon as Coco LaBouche, John Lithgow as Jean-Claude, and Mako Iwamatsu as Mr. Yamaguchi. This is Christine Cavanaugh's final film role before her retirement in 2001 and death in 2014. The film features a Mozart version of the "Rugrats" theme song at the start of the film.

Rugrats Go Wild (2003)

This film is a crossover between the Rugrats and The Wild Thornberrys. In this film, Stu and Didi Pickles decide to take a special vacation with their children, Tommy and Dil, with their friends coming along for the ride. However, the ship Stu has chartered isn't especially seaworthy, and their party ends up stranded on an uncharted island in the Pacific. The kids figure the day is saved when they discover that famous explorer and television personality Sir Nigel Thornberry is also on the island with his family, but after he gets a world-class knock on the head from a coconut, Nigel's upper intellectual register gets knocked out of commission. The Rugrats are then forced to turn to Nigel's daughter, Eliza, who not only knows the wilds, but can talk to animals, which comes as quite a surprise to Spike, the Pickles' family pooch. In addition to The Wild Thornberrys cast members reprising their roles, this film guest stars Bruce Willis as the voice of Spike, Chrissie Hynde as Siri the clouded leopard, and Ethan Phillips as Toa. This is also the first and only time Nancy Cartwright voiced Chuckie Finster in a film since his original voice actress retired in 2001. During its theatrical release, the film was presented with scratch-and-sniff cards (which are handed out at the box-office) to enhance the film experience. The scratch-and-sniff cards were also included on the home video version of the film. The film was not as successful as its two predecessors.

TV films

Runaway Reptar (1999)

All Growed Up (2001)

Video games 
 Rugrats Adventure Game (1998)
 Rugrats: Search for Reptar (1998)
 The Rugrats Movie (1998)
 Rugrats: Scavenger Hunt (1999)
 Rugrats: Time Travelers (1999)
 Rugrats: Studio Tour (1999)
 Rugrats: Totally Angelica (2000)
 Rugrats in Paris: The Movie (2000)
 Rugrats: Castle Capers (2001)
 Rugrats: All Growed-Up (2001)
 Rugrats: I Gotta Go Party (2002)
 Rugrats: Royal Ransom (2002)
 All Grown Up!: Express Yourself (2004)

Live performances

Rugrats: A Live Adventure 
Rugrats: A Live Adventure was a show about Angelica's constant attempts to scare Chuckie.

Books

Let My Babies Go! A Passover Story (1998)

The Rugrats Files (2000–02) 
 The Quest for the Holey Pail by Sarah Willson (2000)

 The Case of the Missing Gold by David Lewman (2000)

 Yo-Ho-Ho and a Bottle of Milk by Kitty Richards (2000)

 Tale of an Unfinished Masterpiece by Maria Rosado (2001)

 In Search of Reptar by Steven Banks (2002)

Comic strip

Rugrats (1998–2003) 
From 1998 to 2003, Nick produced a Rugrats comic strip, which was distributed through Creators Syndicate.

Characters 

 Tommy Pickles
 Angelica Pickles
 Reptar

Themes

Judaism in Rugrats

References

Mass media franchises
 
Nickelodeon original programming
Paramount Global franchises
Klasky Csupo